Pseudomyrmex is a genus of stinging, wasp-like ants in the subfamily Pseudomyrmecinae. They are large-eyed, slender ants, found mainly in tropical and subtropical regions of the New World.

Distribution and habitat
Pseudomyrmex is predominantly Neotropical in distribution, but a few species are known from the Nearctic region. Most species  are generalist twig nesters, for instance, Pseudomyrmex pallidus may nest in the hollow stems of dead grasses, twigs of herbaceous plants, and in dead, woody twigs. However, the genus is best known for several species that are obligate mutualists with certain species of Acacia. Other species have evolved obligate mutualism with other trees; for example Pseudomyrmex triplarinus is obligately dependent on any of a few trees in the genus Triplaris.

Species

 Pseudomyrmex acanthobius (Emery, 1896)
 Pseudomyrmex adustus (Borgmeier, 1929)
 Pseudomyrmex alternans (Santschi, 1936)
 Pseudomyrmex alustratus Ward, 1989
 Pseudomyrmex alvarengai Kempf, 1961
 Pseudomyrmex antiguanus (Enzmann, 1944)
 Pseudomyrmex antiquus Ward, 1992
 Pseudomyrmex apache Creighton, 1953
 Pseudomyrmex atripes (Smith, 1860)
 Pseudomyrmex avitus Ward, 1992
 Pseudomyrmex baros Ward, 1992
 Pseudomyrmex beccarii (Menozzi, 1935)
 Pseudomyrmex boopis (Roger, 1863)
 Pseudomyrmex browni Kempf, 1967
 Pseudomyrmex brunneus (Smith, 1877)
 Pseudomyrmex caeciliae (Forel, 1913)
 Pseudomyrmex championi (Forel, 1899)
 Pseudomyrmex cladoicus (Smith, 1858)
 Pseudomyrmex colei (Enzmann, 1944)
 Pseudomyrmex concolor (Smith, 1860)
 Pseudomyrmex coronatus (Wheeler, 1942)
 Pseudomyrmex coruscus Ward, 1992
 Pseudomyrmex cretus Ward, 1989
 Pseudomyrmex cubaensis (Forel, 1901)
 Pseudomyrmex curacaensis (Forel, 1912)
 Pseudomyrmex dendroicus (Forel, 1904)
 Pseudomyrmex denticollis (Emery, 1890)
 Pseudomyrmex depressus (Forel, 1906)
 Pseudomyrmex distinctus (Smith, 1877)
 Pseudomyrmex duckei (Forel, 1906)
 Pseudomyrmex eduardi (Forel, 1912)
 Pseudomyrmex ejectus (Smith, 1858)
 Pseudomyrmex elongatulus (Dalla Torre, 1892)
 Pseudomyrmex elongatus (Mayr, 1870)
 Pseudomyrmex endophytus (Forel, 1912)
 Pseudomyrmex ethicus (Forel, 1911)
 Pseudomyrmex euryblemma (Forel, 1899)
 Pseudomyrmex excisus (Mayr, 1870)
 Pseudomyrmex extinctus (Carpenter, 1930)
 Pseudomyrmex faber (Smith, 1858)
 Pseudomyrmex ferrugineus (Smith, 1877)
 Pseudomyrmex fervidus (Smith, 1877)
 Pseudomyrmex fiebrigi (Forel, 1908)
 Pseudomyrmex filiformis (Fabricius, 1804)
 Pseudomyrmex flavicornis (Smith, 1877)
 Pseudomyrmex flavidulus (Smith, 1858)
 Pseudomyrmex gebellii (Forel, 1899)
 Pseudomyrmex gibbinotus (Forel, 1908)
 Pseudomyrmex godmani (Forel, 1899)
 Pseudomyrmex goeldii (Forel, 1912)
 Pseudomyrmex gracilis (Fabricius, 1804)
 Pseudomyrmex haytianus (Forel, 1901)
 Pseudomyrmex hesperius Ward, 1993
 Pseudomyrmex holmgreni (Wheeler, 1925)
 Pseudomyrmex incurrens (Forel, 1912)
 Pseudomyrmex ita (Forel, 1906)
 Pseudomyrmex janzeni Ward, 1993
 Pseudomyrmex kuenckeli (Emery, 1890)
 Pseudomyrmex laevifrons Ward, 1989
 Pseudomyrmex laevigatus (Smith, 1877)
 Pseudomyrmex laevivertex (Forel, 1906)
 Pseudomyrmex leptosus Ward, 1985
 Pseudomyrmex lynceus (Spinola, 1851)
 Pseudomyrmex macrops Ward, 1992
 Pseudomyrmex maculatus (Smith, 1855)
 Pseudomyrmex major (Forel, 1899)
 Pseudomyrmex malignus (Wheeler, 1921)
 Pseudomyrmex mandibularis (Spinola, 1851)
 Pseudomyrmex mixtecus Ward, 1993
 Pseudomyrmex monochrous (Dalla Torre, 1892)
 Pseudomyrmex nexilis Ward, 1992
 Pseudomyrmex niger (Donisthorpe, 1940)
 Pseudomyrmex nigrescens (Forel, 1904)
 Pseudomyrmex nigrocinctus (Emery, 1890)
 Pseudomyrmex nigropilosus (Emery, 1890)
 Pseudomyrmex oculatus (Smith, 1855)
 Pseudomyrmex oki (Forel, 1906)
 Pseudomyrmex opaciceps Ward, 1993
 Pseudomyrmex opacior (Forel, 1904)
 Pseudomyrmex oryctus Ward, 1992
 Pseudomyrmex osurus (Forel, 1911)
 Pseudomyrmex pallens (Mayr, 1870)
 Pseudomyrmex pallidus (Smith, 1855)
 Pseudomyrmex particeps Ward, 1993
 Pseudomyrmex pazosi (Santschi, 1909)
 Pseudomyrmex peperi (Forel, 1913)
 Pseudomyrmex perboscii (Guerin-Meneville, 1844)
 Pseudomyrmex peruvianus (Wheeler, 1925)
 Pseudomyrmex phyllophilus (Smith, 1858)
 Pseudomyrmex pictus (Stitz, 1913)
 Pseudomyrmex pisinnus Ward, 1989
 Pseudomyrmex prioris Ward, 1992
 Pseudomyrmex pupa (Forel, 1911)
 Pseudomyrmex reconditus Ward, 1993
 Pseudomyrmex rochai (Forel, 1912)
 Pseudomyrmex rufiventris (Forel, 1911)
 Pseudomyrmex rufomedius (Smith, 1877)
 Pseudomyrmex salvini (Forel, 1899)
 Pseudomyrmex santschii (Enzmann, 1944)
 Pseudomyrmex satanicus (Wheeler, 1942)
 †Pseudomyrmex saxulum LaPolla & Greenwalt, 2015
 Pseudomyrmex schuppi (Forel, 1901)
 Pseudomyrmex seminole Ward, 1985
 Pseudomyrmex sericeus (Mayr, 1870)
 Pseudomyrmex simplex (Smith, 1877)
 Pseudomyrmex simulans Kempf, 1958
 Pseudomyrmex solisi (Santschi, 1916)
 Pseudomyrmex spiculus Ward, 1989
 Pseudomyrmex spinicola (Emery, 1890)
 Pseudomyrmex squamifer (Emery, 1890)
 Pseudomyrmex subater (Wheeler, 1914)
 Pseudomyrmex subtilissimus (Emery, 1890)
 Pseudomyrmex succinus Ward, 1992
 Pseudomyrmex tachigaliae (Forel, 1904)
 Pseudomyrmex tenuis (Fabricius, 1804)
 Pseudomyrmex tenuissimus (Emery, 1906)
 Pseudomyrmex terminalis (Smith, 1877)
 Pseudomyrmex termitarius (Smith, 1855)
 Pseudomyrmex thecolor Ward, 1992
 Pseudomyrmex triplaridis (Forel, 1904)
 Pseudomyrmex triplarinus (Weddell, 1850)
 Pseudomyrmex unicolor (Smith, 1855)
 Pseudomyrmex urbanus (Smith, 1877)
 Pseudomyrmex veneficus (Wheeler, 1942)
 Pseudomyrmex venustus (Smith, 1858)
 †Pseudomyrmex vicinus Ward, 1992
 Pseudomyrmex viduus (Smith, 1858)
 Pseudomyrmex villosus Ward, 1989
 Pseudomyrmex voytowskii (Enzmann, 1944)
 Pseudomyrmex weberi (Enzmann, 1944)
 Pseudomyrmex wheeleri (Enzmann, 1944)

References

External links
 

Pseudomyrmecinae
Ant genera
Hymenoptera of South America
Hymenoptera of North America
Taxonomy articles created by Polbot